John Jenkins with Kenny Burrell is an album by American jazz saxophonist John Jenkins and jazz guitarist Kenny Burrell recorded in 1957 by the Blue Note label and first released as BLP 1573 (mono).

Reception
The Allmusic review by Scott Yanow awarded the album 3 stars stating "Sounding at times like Charlie Parker (with touches of Phil Woods and Jackie McLean), Jenkins easily keeps up with his better-known sidemen and plays the boppish music with plenty of creativity, emotion, and excitement. After listening to the high-quality set, one wonders why Jenkins did not make it".

Track listing
All compositions by John Jenkins except as indicated
 "From This Moment On" (Cole Porter) - 7:37
 "Motif" - 6:14
 "Everything I Have Is Yours" (Harold Adamson, Burton Lane) - 6:10
 "Sharon" - 7:47
 "Chalumeau" - 5:56
 "Blues for Two" (Kenny Burrell) - 4:42
 "Sharon" [alternate take] - 6:27
 "Chalumeau" [alternate take] - 5:58
Recorded at Rudy Van Gelder Studio in Hackensack, New Jersey on August 11, 1957.

Personnel
John Jenkins - alto saxophone
Kenny Burrell - guitar
Sonny Clark - piano
Paul Chambers - bass
Dannie Richmond - drums

References

Blue Note Records albums
John Jenkins (jazz musician) albums
Kenny Burrell albums
1957 albums
Albums produced by Alfred Lion
Albums recorded at Van Gelder Studio